Tatorinia is a genus of moths of the family Erebidae. The genus was erected by Arthur Gardiner Butler in 1875.

Species
Tatorinia bilinea (Holland, 1894) Gabon, Cameroon
Tatorinia fumipennis (Felder & Rogenhofer, 1874) Kenya, Mozambique, South Africa
Tatorinia pallidipennis Hampson, 1926 Sierra Leone, southern Nigeria, Cameroon, Zaire, Uganda, Tanzania
Tatorinia rufipennis Hampson, 1926 southern Nigeria

References

Calpinae